The Maine Open is the Maine state open golf tournament, open to both amateur and professional golfers. It is organized by the Maine State Golf Association. It has been played annually since 1918 at a variety of courses around the state.

The first tournament, in 1918, was won by Arthur H. Fenn, who is stated by some sources to be the first American-born golf professional. The tournament is currently called The Maine Event

Winners

Source:

References

External links
Maine State Golf Association
List of winners

Golf in Maine
State Open golf tournaments
Sports in Portland, Maine
Recurring sporting events established in 1918
1918 establishments in Maine